Mount Bumstead is a large, isolated mountain,  high, standing  southeast of Otway Massif in the Grosvenor Mountains in Antarctica. It was discovered by R. Admiral Byrd on the Byrd Antarctic Expedition flight to the South Pole in November 1929 and named by him for Albert H. Bumstead, chief cartographer of the National Geographic Society at that time, and inventor of the sun compass, a device utilizing shadows of the sun to determine directions in areas where magnetic compasses are unreliable.

References 

Mountains of the Ross Dependency
Dufek Coast